Charles Memorial Hamilton (November 1, 1840 – October 22, 1875) was a US Representative from Florida.

Biography
Born in Pine Creek Township, Clinton County, Pennsylvania, Hamilton attended public schools and was graduated from the Columbia Law School, Columbia, Pennsylvania.

During the American Civil War, Hamilton entered the Union Army as a private in 1861 and served in Company A, Fifth Regiment, Pennsylvania Reserves.  He was appointed judge-advocate of the general court-martial and general pass officer for the Army of the Potomac and also served on the staff of the Military Governor of Washington, D.C., until he was transferred to Marianna, Florida in 1865.

Hamilton was admitted to the bar in 1867 and commenced practicing law in Marianna, Florida.  Upon the readmission of the State of Florida to representation, Hamilton was elected as a Republican to the Fortieth and Forty-first Congresses and served from July 1, 1868, to March 3, 1871.  He was unsuccessful in his candidacy for renomination in 1870.

Hamilton was appointed Senior Major General of the Florida Militia in February 1871, was postmaster of Jacksonville, Florida from July 27, 1871, to March 1, 1872, and was appointed collector of customs at Key West, Florida, in February 1872, a position from which he resigned on account of ill health.

Hamilton died in Pine Creek Township, Clinton County, Pa. and was interred at the Jersey Shore Cemetery.

Further reading
 "More Courage than Discretion': Charles M. Hamilton in Reconstruction-Era Florida," Florida Historical Quarterly 84 (Spring 2006).

References
 Retrieved on 2008-09-28

1840 births
1875 deaths
People from Clinton County, Pennsylvania
Republican Party members of the United States House of Representatives from Florida
19th-century American politicians
Pennsylvania Reserves
Union Army officers
Military personnel from Pennsylvania